The Pakistan Ambassador to the United States is in charge of the Pakistan Embassy, Washington, D.C. and Pakistan's diplomatic mission to the United States. The official title is Ambassador of the Islamic Republic of Pakistan to the United States of America.

Masood Khan is the current ambassador to the United States.

History
The embassy of Pakistan in Washington, D.C. was built on 28 August 1947, when Pakistan attained independence from Great Britain and separated from India to form the Dominion of Pakistan. From the onset, Pakistan adopted a pro-American policy, with relations taking an upturn in 1954 when Pakistan signed several defense pacts with the United States- first the SEATO and then CENTO in 1955. Their relations were soured because of the subsequent Indo-Pakistani Wars of 1965 and 1971, but were rejuvenated due to the 1979 Soviet invasion of Afghanistan and the ensuing covert war of 1980–88. Pakistan's secret nuclear programme led the US to impose sanctions on Pakistan, thus deteriorating Pakistani-American relations, but the War on Terrorism again placed Pakistan in the good books of America, improving the two countries' bilateral relations once more.

Therefore, the Pakistani ambassadors to the US were not only the top officers of the Pakistani civil service, but also political appointees of respective governments of the time. Some former ambassadors later rose to command positions in the Pakistani government, with one of them, Muhammad Ali Bogra, becoming the Prime Minister of Pakistan.

List of Pakistani Ambassadors to the United States

See also
United States Ambassador to Pakistan
Embassy of the United States, Islamabad

References

 
United States
Pakistan